Port Sanilac Light is a United States Coast Guard lighthouse located on Point Sanilac, near Port Sanilac on the eastern side of Michigan's Thumb.  It is an automated and active aid to navigation on Lake Huron.

History
Characterized by shallow water and sandbanks, the  stretch of coastline between the Fort Gratiot Light and Pointe aux Barques Light is a hazard to navigation.  Even after the establishment of the Sand Beach Harbor of Refuge Light in 1875,  of coast line still remained completely unlit.

Eighteen years after the first attempts to get congressional funding, the station was established and first lit in 1886.

The Port Sanilac Light's foundation consists of dressed stone and timber. The octagon-hourglass-shaped tower (near its top) is made of tiered and reverse stair-stepped brick. Eschewing the usual corbels, a dozen courses of bricks create the gallery support, with four indentations for windows, creating a watch room for the four points of the compass. The lighthouse was built at a cost of $20,000. The placement and the unique shape were dictated by and created because of budgetary constraints (Congress appropriated only half the money requested). Designed by Eleventh District Engineer Captain Charles E. L. B. Davis, the design has been called "both unique and architecturally significant in its elegance." The tower is white with a red roof.

This "handsome" lighthouse shares its design with only one other, Ile Aux Galets, also known as Skilligallee Island Light, on Lake Michigan.

The Port Sanilac Light tower is capped with a cast iron lantern room, which still houses a fourth order Fresnel lens manufactured by Barbier and Fenestre of Paris. The lens and its brass reflector on one segment (the reflector blocked the lens on the landward side) send the light out in a 300 degree arc across the lake. The light sits atop high ground at the head of a small bay. This is one of only 70 such Fresnel lenses that are still operational in the United States, sixteen of which are use on the Great Lakes of which eight are in Michigan.

Port Sanilac Light Station — Lake St. is a registered site on the National Register of Historic Places, being added on August 19, 1984 as listed site #84001842. Name of Listing: PORT SANILAC LIGHT STATION (U.S. COAST GUARD/GREAT LAKES TR).

The Port Sanilac Light complex currently consists of five historic structures.  In addition to the light tower and ornate brick Lighthouse keeper's residence, the brick oil house, wooden outhouse, and well also survive.  The well is covered by a safety platform of wooden planks.

Because of its unique and picturesque form and location, it is often the subject of photographs, and even of needlepoint illustrations.  Drawings have also been produced, as have postcards.

The original fourth order Fresnel lens is still operative, being one of only 70 such lenses that remain operational in the United States; sixteen of them are use on the Great Lakes, of which eight are in Michigan.

The lighthouse, including the keeper's house, is for sale.

Getting there
The lighthouse is private property; access around it is prohibited.  Viewing from the parking lot is very good. You can also walk down toward the beach and breakwater to get a good view of the lighthouse and harbor.

From  M-25 in Port Sanilac, Michigan, turn east onto Cherry Street, taking it to the Lake Huron shore. Public parking is at the terminus of Cherry Street, directly south of the light. The breakwater "is a nice place from which the lighthouse can be photographed."

See also
Lighthouses in the United States

References

External links
 
 
 
 Interactive map of lighthouses in area.
 Interactive map, list, information for lighthouses in North and West Lake Huron.
 Michigan.gov website has a Map of Michigan Lighthouses.
 Port Sanilac Lighthouse at Seeing the Light by Terry Pepper.
 Satellite view at Google Maps.
  Photo gallery
  Photo gallery
  Same photo, pinned at Facebook

Lighthouses completed in 1886
Houses completed in 1886
Buildings and structures in Sanilac County, Michigan
Lighthouses on the National Register of Historic Places in Michigan
National Register of Historic Places in Sanilac County, Michigan